The 1976 United States presidential election in South Carolina took place on November 2, 1976. All 50 states and the District of Columbia were part of the 1976 United States presidential election. South Carolina voters chose 8 electors to the Electoral College, who voted for president and vice president.

South Carolina voted for the Democratic nominee, former Georgia Governor Jimmy Carter, and his running mate Walter Mondale over the Republican nominee, President Gerald Ford and his running mate Senator Bob Dole. Carter won South Carolina by a margin of 13.04% above Ford.

Ford managed to carry just three of South Carolina's counties, while Nixon managed to carry all 46 counties four years earlier. , this is the last time that the Democratic nominee carried South Carolina, the last time a Democrat won Horry County, Spartanburg County, Berkeley County, Beaufort County, Dorchester County, Florence County, Pickens County, Kershaw County, and Newberry County, and the last time a Democrat swept every congressional district in the state. Had Ford carried South Carolina, the state would've had the longest streak of Republican presidential victories.

Results

Results by county

Notes

References

South Carolina
1976
1976 South Carolina elections